Carla D. Cunningham (born January 12, 1962) is an American Democratic politician. She has served as a member of the North Carolina House of Representatives from the 106th district since 2012.

Education and career
She was born in Wadesboro, North Carolina, and graduated from Anson High School in 1980.  She earned a diploma in nursing from Central Piedmont Community College in 1981, an associate's degree in nursing from Gaston College in 1996, and a bachelor's of science in nursing from Winston-Salem State University in 2009. She practiced nursing for more than 30 years.

Electoral history

2020

2018

2016

2014

2012

References

Living people
1962 births
People from Wadesboro, North Carolina
People from Charlotte, North Carolina
Politicians from Charlotte, North Carolina
Winston-Salem State University alumni
20th-century African-American people
20th-century African-American women
21st-century African-American women
21st-century American politicians
21st-century American women politicians
21st-century African-American politicians
Women state legislators in North Carolina
African-American women in politics
African-American state legislators in North Carolina
Democratic Party members of the North Carolina House of Representatives